Livestrong can refer to:

The Livestrong Foundation, an organization established by Lance Armstrong that supports for people affected by cancer
Livestrong Sporting Park, former name for Children's Mercy Park, a soccer stadium in Kansas City, Kansas
livestrong.com, a health brand operated by the Leaf Group